Ashbank is a small settlement near Leeds  in Kent, England.